Lazer Tag Academy is an animated television series inspired by Worlds of Wonder's Lazer Tag (their branded version of the pursuit game referred to generically as "laser tag") that was created by Ruby-Spears Productions. Original episodes aired on NBC from September 13 to December 6, 1986, with reruns lasting until August 22, 1987.

It was later shown in reruns under the new title Lazer Patrol on the Sci Fi Channel as part of Sci Fi Cartoon Quest.

Another laser tag related series, DIC Entertainment's live-action Photon series aired the same year in syndication.

The show contains numerous pop culture references, from The Man In The Iron Mask to E.T. The Extraterrestrial.

Synopsis
Jamie Jaren, the Lazer Tag Champion of 3010, travels back in time to the year 1987 to help her ancestors, teenagers Tom and Beth and toddler Nicky. Jamie protects the kids from Draxon Drear, a master criminal from the year 2061 who was unwittingly revived from suspended animation by Jamie's teacher Professor Olanga after he ended up in that state following a spaceship hijacking accident. Draxon's spaceship crashed into the Atlantic Ocean and was kept in suspended animation until he was revived. Professor Olanga's analysis reveals that Draxon is a relative of Jamie.

Draxon has traveled back in time to destroy Beth because she would eventually create the Starlyte gun and Starsensor (two real-life Lazer Tag products) worn by Jamie. These machines enabled Jamie to compete in the Lazer Tag tournaments of her time period. In the hands of certain individuals, a Starlyte is capable of producing effects that enable the wielder to manipulate matter and energy on a molecular scale and with the aid of the Starsensor, travel through time.

Draxon leads a group of genetically-enhanced humanoids called Skuggs who were originally created to serve humanity before they ended up in Draxon's thrall. One of the Skuggs accidentally sets off the suspended animation gas on Draxon's spaceship, which reawakens Draxon and the Skuggs several centuries in the future.

Beth and Tom's parents Andrew and Genna Jaren were mostly ignorant to the battles with Draxon Drear and the Skuggs and believed Jamie was a foreign exchange student. In addition, Tom and Beth's schoolmate Charles Ferguson is suspicious of Jamie, and repeatedly tries to learn her secret.

Episodes
 The Beginning (September 13, 1986) - Jamie Jaren pursues Draxon Drear from 3010 to 1987, and meets her ancestors, Tom, Beth, and Nicky Jaren.
 Skugg Duggery (September 20, 1986) - Everyone in town is turned into Skuggs and the Jarens have to change them back.
 Yamoto's Curse (September 27, 1986) - The Jarens head to Tokyo where Drear has stolen Dr. Yamato's special plant food.
 Pay Dirt (October 4, 1986) - The Jarens capture Drear only to find out he planted a bomb that will trigger a devastating earthquake.
 Charles' Science Project (October 11, 1986) - Charles Ferguson steals the Jarens' Starlyte Blocker and claims it as his own.
 The Witch Switch (October 18, 1986) - Drear travels back to Salem, Massachusetts in 1690 to make sure Abigail Jaren is condemned for being a witch.
 The Olanga Story (October 25, 1986) - Drear and the Skuggs head to 13th Century Africa to prevent a royal marriage so that Professor Olanga is never born.
 Battle Hymn of Jaren's (November 1, 1986) - The Jarens go to Gettysburg, Pennsylvania in 1863 to ensure that Bo Jaren marries Sara Beth. But will Drear have his way and prevent the modern Jarens from being born?
 Sir Tom of Jaren (November 8, 1986) - Tom, Beth, and Jamie go back in time to Camelot where Drear has decided to steal Excalibur and kidnap Guinevere.
 Redbeard's Treasure (November 15, 1986) - Jamie, Tom, and Beth go back to 1748 to get Redbeard's treasure for a sea captain to prevent foreclosure on his boat, not knowing Drear and the Skuggs are there, too. Note: Nicky, Ralphie, Mr. and Mrs. Jaren, and Charles Ferguson do not appear in this episode.
 Drear's Doll (November 22, 1986) -The Jarens decide to help a lost child unaware that she's an android programmed by Drear to steal their Starlytes.
 StarLyte on the Orient Express (November 29, 1986) - Jamie, Tom, Beth, and Drear all end up on the Orient Express when their Starlytes are stolen by a mysterious thief. Note: The character Agatha Marble is a combo of Agatha Christie and her fictional detective Miss Marple.
 Jamie and the Spitfires (December 6, 1986) = The Jarens are called to the year 3010 to deal with Drear and The Spitfires, a futuristic biker gang, led by Jamie's old rival Corbin Tucker. Series finale.

Cast
 Booker Bradshaw - Draxon Drear
 Pat Fraley - Charlie Ferguson, Skuggs
 Noelle Harling - Jamie Jaren
 Billy Jayne - Tom Jaren
 Don LaFontaine - Opening Narration
 Christina MacGregor - Beth Jaren
 Tress MacNeille - Genna Jaren
 Sid McCoy - Professor Olanga
 Frank Welker - Andrew Jaren, Skuggs, Ralphie
 R.J. Williams - Nicky Jaren

Additional voices
 Susan Blu
 Phillip Clark
 Michael Horton
 Harvey Jason
 Rodney Kageyama
 Maurice LaMarche
 Mel Wells

Crew
 Michael Hack - Voice Director
 Dan DiStefano - Story Editor
 Ted Field - Assistant Story Editor
 John Kimball and Rudy Larriva - Series Directors

UK VHS release

Home video and syndication
Three VHS tapes were released by Celebrity Home Entertainment:

 Laser Tag Academy: The Movie was released in 1989 (95 minutes)
 Lazer Tag Academy: Champion's Biggest Challenge was released March 21, 1989 (110 minutes)
 The third tape was released on June 19, 1991, with a single episode, The Battle Hymn of the Jarens.

Lazer Tag Academy was later rerun in syndication under the name Laser Patrol. This version was also shown briefly on the Sci-Fi Channel.

References

External links
 
 
 
 

1986 American television series debuts
1987 American television series endings
1980s American animated television series
1980s American time travel television series
American children's animated action television series
American children's animated adventure television series
American children's animated science fantasy television series
American time travel television series
NBC original programming
Television series by Ruby-Spears
Television series by Claster Television
Laser tag
Television series set in 1986
Television series by Saban Entertainment
Fiction set in the 31st century